Bruno Menezes Soares (born 2 February 1983), known as Bruno Mineiro, is a Brazilian footballer who plays as a striker.

External links

1983 births
Living people
Footballers from Belo Horizonte
Brazilian footballers
Association football forwards
Campeonato Brasileiro Série A players
Campeonato Brasileiro Série B players
Campeonato Brasileiro Série C players
Londrina Esporte Clube players
Esporte Clube Noroeste players
América Futebol Clube (MG) players
Clube Náutico Capibaribe players
Club Athletico Paranaense players
Sport Club do Recife players
Associação Portuguesa de Desportos players
Goiás Esporte Clube players
Santa Cruz Futebol Clube players
Enköpings SK players
Al-Khor SC players
Brazilian expatriate footballers
Brazilian expatriate sportspeople in Sweden
Expatriate footballers in Sweden
Brazilian expatriate sportspeople in Qatar
Expatriate footballers in Qatar